The 2012 Southern Conference men's soccer tournament is the seventeenth edition of the tournament. The tournament decided the Southern Conference champion and guaranteed representative into the 2012 NCAA Division I Men's Soccer Championship. The tournament was held November 3–10, 2012. Top-seed Elon defeated 7th-seed Wofford 2–1 in the Championship game.

Qualification

Bracket

Schedule

Quarterfinals

Semifinals

SoCon Championship

Statistical leaders

See also
 Southern Conference
 2012 Southern Conference men's soccer season
 2012 NCAA Division I men's soccer season
 2012 NCAA Division I Men's Soccer Championship

References

Tournament
Southern Conference Men's Soccer Tournament